The International Journal of Applied Mathematics and Computer Science is a peer-reviewed quarterly scientific journal published since 1991 by the University of Zielona Góra in partnership with De Gruyter Poland and Lubuskie Scientific Society, under the auspices of the Committee on Automatic Control and Robotics of the Polish Academy of Sciences. The editor-in-chief is Józef Korbicz. The journal covers various fields related to control theory, applied mathematics, scientific computing, and computer science.

Indexing and abstracting 
The journal is abstracted and indexed, e.g., in:

The full list of indexing services is available on the journal's website.

According to the Journal Citation Reports, the journal has a 2021 impact factor of 2.157.

References

External links 
 

Computer science journals
Mathematics journals
English-language journals
Open access journals
Publications established in 1991
Quarterly journals
Polish Academy of Sciences academic journals